WUZR 105.7 FM is a radio station broadcasting a country music format. Licensed to Bicknell, Indiana.  The station serves the Vincennes, Indiana area, and is owned by The Original Company, Inc.

References

External links
WUZR's webpage

UZR